Kępa Kiełpińska  (German Kielpiciener Kämpe) is a village in the administrative district of Gmina Łomianki, within Warsaw West County, Masovian Voivodeship, in east-central Poland. The village was founded and settled by Vistula Germans till 1945.

References

Villages in Warsaw West County